Nada es Imposible may refer to:

 "Nada es Imposible" (song), a 1997 song by Ricky Martín
 Nada Es Imposible, a 2014 album by Planetshakers

See also
Nothing Is Impossible (disambiguation)